Bəklə (also, Bekle and Beklya) is a village and municipality in the Gobustan Rayon of Azerbaijan.  It has a population of 280.

References 

Populated places in Gobustan District